The National Institute of Building Sciences is a non-profit, non-governmental organization that brings together representatives of government, the professions, industry, labor and consumer interests, and regulatory agencies to focus on the identification and resolution of problems and potential problems that hamper the construction of safe, affordable structures for housing, commerce and industry throughout the United States. Authorized by the U.S. Congress in the Housing and Community Development Act of 1974.

Councils and Workgroups
 Building Enclosure Technology and Environment Council (BETEC)
 Building Information Management (BIM) Council (formerly the buildingSMART alliance) 
 Building Seismic Safety Council (BSSC)
 Consultative Council
 Facility Management and Operations Council (FMOC)
 Multi-Hazard Mitigation Council (MMC)
 Off-Site Construction Council
 Whole Building Design Guide (WBDG) Workgroup

Technology programs
 HAZUS
 ProjNet
 Whole Building Design Guide WBDG

News
 NIBS Member Quarterly Newsletter

Standards and publications
 National BIM Standard - United States
 United States National CAD Standard

Former councils include:
 Facility Information Council (FIC)
 International Alliance for Interoperability (IAI)

Charter members 
  Mortimer M. Marshall Jr., FAIA
  Homer Hurst

See also
 National CAD Standard
 Whole Building Design Guide

External links
 

Building engineering organizations
Professional associations based in the United States
Institutes based in the United States